Highgate is a suburban area of north London at the northeastern corner of Hampstead Heath,  north-northwest of Charing Cross.

Highgate is one of the most expensive London suburbs in which to live. It has three active conservation organisations, the Highgate Society, the Highgate Neighbourhood Forum and the Highgate Conservation Area Advisory Committee to protect and enhance its character and amenities.

Until late Victorian times it was a distinct village outside London, sitting astride the main road to the north. The area retains many green expanses including the eastern part of Hampstead Heath, three ancient woods, Waterlow Park and the eastern-facing slopes known as Highgate bowl.

At its centre is Highgate village, largely a collection of Georgian shops, pubs, restaurants and residential streets interspersed with diverse landmarks such as St Michael's Church and steeple, St. Joseph's Church and its green copper dome, Highgate School (1565), Jacksons Lane arts centre housed in a Grade II listed former church, the Gatehouse Inn dating from 1670 which houses the theatre Upstairs at the Gatehouse and Berthold Lubetkin's 1930s Highpoint buildings. Pond Square, behind the High Street, is a registered village green and is the centre of communal activities which take place in the elegant buildings of the Highgate Literary and Scientific Institution and Highgate Society facing the Square.

Highgate is perhaps best known for the Victorian Highgate Cemetery in which the Communist philosopher Karl Marx and the novelist George Eliot are buried, along with many other notable people.

The village is at the top of Highgate Hill, which provides views across central London.

The area is divided among three London boroughs: Haringey in the north, Camden in the south and west, and Islington in the south and east. The postal district is N6.

History

Historically, Highgate adjoined the Bishop of London's hunting estate. Highgate gets its name from these hunting grounds, as there was a high, deer-proof hedge surrounding the estate: 'the gate in the hedge'.

The bishop kept a toll-house where one of the main northward roads out of London entered his land. A number of pubs sprang up along the route, one of which, the Gatehouse, commemorates the toll-house.

Hampstead Lane and Highgate Hill contain the red brick Victorian buildings of Highgate School and its adjacent Chapel of St Michael. The school has played a paramount role in the life of the village and has existed on its site since its founding was permitted by letters patent from Queen Elizabeth I in 1565.

The area north of the High Street and Hampstead Lane was part of Hornsey parish and also later the Municipal Borough of Hornsey, and the seat of that borough's governing body for many years.

Highgate Hill, the steep street linking Archway (traditionally called part of Upper Holloway) and Highgate village, was the route of the Highgate Hill Cable Tramway, the first cable car to be built in Europe. It operated between 1884 and 1909.

Like much of London, Highgate suffered damage during World War II by German air raids. The local tube station was used as a bomb shelter.

Highgate New Town is a post-war estate adjacent to the cemetery, designed by Camden Council with similarities to the Alexandra Road estate.

Governance
Between 1983 and 2010 Highgate was part of the Hampstead and Highgate constituency. The Boundary Commission report of 2003 recommended removing the Camden part of Highgate from the remainder of that constituency and joining it with Kentish Town and Holborn to the south in order to form an enlarged Holborn and St Pancras constituency from the 2010 general election. Since 1983 the northern half of Highgate village has been part of the Hornsey and Wood Green constituency.  The present MP for Holborn and St Pancras, elected in 2015, is Keir Starmer of the Labour Party.

Transport and locale

Nearest places
 Archway
 Crouch End
 Dartmouth Park
 East Finchley
 Finchley
 Hampstead
 Hornsey
 Kentish Town
 Muswell Hill
 Tufnell Park
 Upper Holloway

Bus routes
 London Buses 143, 210, 214 (24 hour) and 271 (24 hour) all serve Highgate Village.

Nearest tube stations
 Highgate tube station
 Archway tube station
 East Finchley tube station

Places of interest
Highgate is known for its pubs which line the old high street and surrounding streets. Some notable favourites are the Angel, the Flask, the Duke's Head and the Wrestlers.
 Highgate Cemetery
 Highgate Literary and Scientific Institution
 Highgate School
 Channing School
 Highgate Wood
 Holly Lodge Estate
 Jacksons Lane
 Kenwood House
 Highpoint I and II
 Athlone House, formerly known as Caen Wood Towers, the home of the RAF Intelligence School 1942–48.
 Cromwell House
 Lauderdale House
 Witanhurst
 The Grove
 Archway Bridge
 Furnival House
 St Michael's Church
 St Joseph's Church
 Highgate United Synagogue
 St Augustine's Church
 The Winchester, public house in Shaun of the Dead (2004)

Pronunciation 

Demography
The 2011 census showed that the Highgate ward of Haringey was 82% white (60% British, 19% Other, 3% Irish). 40.9% of the ward were Christian, 7% Jewish and 3.8% Muslim.

The Highgate ward of Camden meanwhile was 80% white (61% British, 15% Other, 4% Irish), and 3% Black African. 37.5% of the ward were Christian, 4.2% Jewish, and 5.1% Muslim.

Education

Religion 

Highgate's main Church of England parish church, St Michael's, is situated close to the summit of the hill, and is the highest church in Greater London. It was built as one of the Commissioners' churches in 1831 and consecrated and opened on 8 November 1832. The architect was Lewis Vulliamy, and in 1831 his original drawings for the church were exhibited at the Royal Academy of Arts.

From the late 17th century until 1830 Ashhurst House, the home of former Lord Mayor of London Sir William Ashhurst, stood on the site of the church. The remains of the house's cellar now form part of the church's crypt.

The church's spire, built of Bath stone, with a cross of Portland stone, is a landmark on London's northern skyline.

Inside, the chancel and choir stalls were done by G. E. Street in 1880. The pulpit dates from 1848. The present bench pews date from 1879, replacing box pews. The present organ is by Hill and Davidson, and was installed in 1885, replacing an earlier instrument of 1842. It was overhauled in 1985.

There is a monument to Samuel Taylor Coleridge and his family in the form of a slate slab in the middle of the church.

The church was damaged in the Second World War by enemy air raids and the present stained glass window at the east end was installed in 1954, replacing a window broken in the Blitz. It is one of the last works by Evie Hone and depicts the Last Supper.

Further down Highgate Hill is the town's Roman Catholic parish church, St Joseph's. It was designed by Albert Vickers, and built in 1888, replacing an earlier, smaller church of 1861. Although St Joseph's Church was opened in 1889 by the Bishop of Liverpool, it was not until 1932, when its debts were cleared, that it was officially consecrated.

The church has a distinctive copper dome with a green patina, and the interior of the dome was painted by Nathaniel Westlake in 1891. The organ is by William Hill and Sons, and installed in 1945 as a memorial to the local victims of the Second World War.

1980s murder 
On Friday 26 August 1988, Michael Williams, a 43-year-old father from Highgate who worked for the Home Office in Pimlico, disappeared while travelling back home after an employee social. His body was found at Highgate Wood the next day. The case remains unsolved despite being featured heavily in the national press and on the BBC's TV programme Crimewatch.

Notable inhabitants

Highgate Cemetery is the burial place of Communist philosopher Karl Marx, Michael Faraday, Douglas Adams, George Eliot, Jacob Bronowski, Sir Ralph Richardson, Dawn Foster, Christina Rossetti, Sir Sidney Nolan, Alexander Litvinenko, Malcolm McLaren, Radclyffe Hall, Joseph Wolf and singer-songwriter George Michael.

 Adjacent to Highgate Cemetery is Holly Lodge Estate, one of only two housing-estates built in the UK for single women; formerly, it was the home and grounds of Baroness Angela Georgina Burdett-Coutts.
 Between 1930 and 1939, the wife and son of Adolf Hitler's half-brother, Alois, lived in Highgate, before moving to the United States. Bridget and Patrick Hitler lived at 26 Priory Gardens.
 Leslie Compton, formerly an Arsenal footballer and a Middlesex cricketer, owned a pub in Highgate after he retired from sports.
 Singer George Michael owned an £8 million house in Highgate.
 Southend United striker Nile Ranger was born in Highgate.
 Rock star Rod Stewart was born and raised in Highgate.
 Rock star Ray Davies of the Kinks was born and raised in nearby Muswell Hill and lives in Highgate.
 Filmmaker Christopher Nolan was raised in Highgate.
 Actor Jude Law lives in Highgate.
 Actor Robert Powell lives in Highgate.
 Comedian Noel Fielding lives in Highgate.
 Singer Liam Gallagher lives in Highgate.
 Comedian Graham Chapman of Monty Python lived in Highgate.

Many notable alumni have passed through Highgate School, either Masters or indeed Old Cholmeleians, the name given to old boys of the school. These include T.S. Eliot, who taught the poet laureate John Betjeman there, Gerard Manley Hopkins the poet, the composers John Taverner and John Rutter, John Venn the inventor of Venn diagrams, actor Geoffrey Palmer, Anthony Crosland MP and Labour reformer, and the cabinet minister Charles Clarke.

A blue plaque on a house at the top of North Hill notes that Charles Dickens stayed there in 1832, when he was 20 years old.

Peter Sellers lived as a boy in a cottage in Muswell Hill Road, where his mother had moved in order to send him to the Catholic St Aloysius Boys' School in Hornsey Lane.

In Victorian times St Mary Magdalene House of Charity in Highgate was a refuge for former prostitutes—"fallen women"—where Christina Rossetti was a volunteer from 1859 to 1870. It may have inspired her best-known poem, Goblin Market.

Siouxsie and the Banshees' bassist Steven Severin was born and brought up there.

Coleridge
In 1817 the poet, aesthetic philosopher and critic Samuel Taylor Coleridge came to live at 3, The Grove, Highgate, the home of Dr James Gillman, in order to rehabilitate from his opium addiction. After Dr Gillman built a special wing for the poet, Coleridge lived there for the rest of his life, becoming known as the sage of Highgate.

While here some of his most famous poems, though written years earlier, were first published including "Kubla Khan". His literary autobiography, Biographia Literaria, appeared in 1817. While living there he became friends with his neighbour Joseph Hardman. His home became a place of pilgrimage for figures such as Carlyle and Emerson. He died here on 25 July 1834 and is buried in the crypt of nearby St Michael's Church. The writer J. B. Priestley subsequently lived in the same house; a commemorative plaque marks the property.

In popular culture

 Highgate's historic feel—in particular the gothic atmosphere of its cemetery—has provided the backdrop to a considerable number of films, including Hammer Horror films of the 1970s and, more recently, Fantastic Beasts: The Crimes of Grindelwald and Dorian Gray.
 The pub tradition of Swearing on the Horns originated in Highgate.
 In Charles Dickens' novel David Copperfield, James Steerforth lives in a house at the top of Highgate West Hill.
 In the BBC sitcom Are You Being Served?, Mr Lucas (played by Trevor Bannister) lives in Highgate.
 Taylor Swift's song "London Boy" from her 2019 album Lover, her boyfriend "took me back to Highgate, met all of his best mates".
 In Robert Galbraith's forthcoming novel The Ink Black Heart, the central murder occurs in Highgate Cemetery.

See also
Hornsey (parish)
Municipal Borough of Hornsey

References

External links

Highgate Literary and Scientific Institution
The Highgate Society
Highgate Neighbourhood Forum
Comprehensive details about Highgate

 
Districts of the London Borough of Haringey
Districts of the London Borough of Camden
Districts of the London Borough of Islington
Areas of London
Places formerly in Middlesex